The 52-hertz whale, colloquially referred to as 52 Blue, is an individual whale of unidentified species that calls at the unusual frequency of 52 hertz. This pitch is at a higher frequency than that of the other whale species with migration patterns most closely resembling the 52-hertz whale'sthe blue whale (10 to 39 Hz) and the fin whale (20 Hz). Its call has been detected regularly in many locations since the late 1980s, and appears to be the only individual emitting a whale call at this frequency. However, the whale itself has never been sighted; it has only been heard via hydrophones. It has been described as the "world's loneliest whale", though potential recordings of a second 52-hertz whale, heard elsewhere at the same time, have been sporadically found since 2010.

Characteristics 

The sonic signature is that of a whale, albeit at a unique frequency. At 52 hertz, it is a little higher than the lowest note on a double bass. The call patterns resemble neither blue nor fin whales, being much higher in frequency, shorter, and more frequent. Blue whales usually vocalize at 10–39 Hz, fin whales at 20 Hz. The 52-hertz calls of this whale are highly variable in their pattern of repetition, duration, and sequence, although they are easily identifiable due to their frequency and characteristic clustering. The calls have deepened slightly to around 50 hertz since 1992, suggesting the whale has grown or matured.

The migration track of the 52-hertz whale is unrelated to the presence or movement of other whale species. Its movements have been somewhat similar to that of blue whales, but its timing has been more like that of fin whales. It is detected in the Pacific Ocean every year beginning in August–December, and moves out of range of the hydrophones in January–February. It travels as far north as the Aleutian and Kodiak Islands, and as far south as the California coast, swimming between 30 and 70 km each day. Its recorded distance traveled per season has ranged from a low of 708 km to a high of 11,062 km in 2002–03.

Scientists at the Woods Hole Oceanographic Institution have been unable to identify the species of the whale. They speculate that it could be malformed or a blue whale hybrid. The research team is often contacted by deaf people who wonder whether the whale may also be deaf.

Whatever biological cause underlies its unusually high frequency voice does not seem to be detrimental to its survival. The fact that the whale has survived and apparently matured indicates it is probably healthy. Still, its call is the only one of its kind detected anywhere and there is only one such source per season. Because of this, the animal has been called the loneliest whale in the world.

Calls picked up by a sensor in 2010 suggest that there may be more than one whale calling at 52 Hz.

History 

The 52-hertz whale was discovered by a team from the Woods Hole Oceanographic Institution. Its call was first detected in 1989, then again in 1990 and 1991. In 1992, following the end of the Cold War, the U.S. Navy partially declassified the recordings and technical specifications of its SOSUS anti-submarine hydrophone arrays, and made SOSUS available for oceanographic research. , the whale had been detected every year since.

In media

Film 
The Loneliest, a short mockumentary film about two women searching for the loneliest whale, was made in April 2014 by Lilian Mehrel, with the Alfred P. Sloan Foundation.

The title of the Taiwanese movie 52Hz, I Love You (2017) is inspired by the whale, using it as a metaphor for the loneliness experienced when looking for love.

The animated short film entitled The Phantom 52 premiered at the Sundance Film Festival in January 2019. The film is written and directed by Geoff Marslett, and stars Tom Skerritt as the loneliest whale. The Phantom 52 went on to play at over 60 film festivals worldwide and win a half dozen awards.

A feature-length documentary entitled The Loneliest Whale: The Search for 52, directed by Joshua Zeman, the director of Cropsey, and executive producers Leonardo DiCaprio and Adrian Grenier, was commercially released by Bleecker Street on July 9, 2021. The film follows Zeman and a group of five scientists and oceanographers on a quest to find the whale off the coast of California. Funded through a Kickstarter campaign, the film received generally positive reviews among critics, holding an approval rating of 86% based on 35 reviews on Rotten Tomatoes. Time's Stephanie Zacharek called the film "both invigorating and calming to watch," while Katie Walsh wrote in the Los Angeles Times that the film is "a modern-day Moby Dick with a conservationist bent" that "surprises, delights and will keep you on the edge of your seat." Sheri Linden of The Hollywood Reporter wrote that "the film's epilogue caps the action with a rapturous surprise", referring to the sightingcomplete with film footageof a blue whale-fin whale hybrid, believed to be the source of the 52 Hz calls.

The 52 hertz whale was also seen in a children's show titled The Deep.

Music
Ambient artist Andy Othling, under the name of Lowercase Noises, released an EP called Migratory Patterns in 2011. The album "is a collection of songs written as a chronicle of the story of the famed 52Hz whale."

Montreal-based saxophone player and composer Colin Stetson's 2013 album New History Warfare Vol. 3: To See More Light included a song entitled "Part of Me Apart From You". Though not explicitly written about the 52-hertz whale, when first performing the song live, he has remarked on at least several occasions that the story of the "loneliest whale" resonated deeply with his composition. "This whale is alone in a large body of water, swimming, singing its song, calling for a likeness it will never find," he said by way of introducing the song at a performance at Toronto's Great Hall on 19 May 2013. "When I play this song, I can't help but think about this whale, who right at this very minute is singing alone."

South Korean group BTS's 2015 album The Most Beautiful Moment in Life, Pt. 2 includes the track "Whalien 52", which explicitly uses the 52-hertz whale as a metaphor for the alienation from others often felt by adolescents.

The English folk duo Kathryn Roberts and Sean Lakeman included the song "52 Hertz" on their 2015 album Tomorrow Will Follow Today. The song is about the whale and includes the line, "52 Hertz, 52 Hertz, I'm singing a love song that no-one can hear" in the chorus.

In 2016, No Land (a music group made up of Azerbaijani, Iranian, Kurdish and Turkish musicians) released 52 Hertz Whale - Outro.

In 2017, Shoegaze band Cloakroom released a song called "52hz Whale."

In 2017, Zhou Shen released a song called "A Lonely Blue Whale Living Like an Island" or "化身孤岛的鲸", inspired by the whale.

In 2018, American singer Chrysta Bell released a song called "52 Hz", inspired by the whale.           
 
In 2020, a Vtuber known as Bao released a song called "52-Hearts," which is a play on words for the 52-hertz whale.

In 2021, Amber Run released a song called "52 Blue."

In 2021, instrumental post rock band Gilmore Trail released a song called "Echoes of Solitude", using their instruments to create their own interpretation of the sounds of the lonely whale.

In 2021, Polish rapper Sokół released a song called "52 Hz", inspired by the whale.

Books 
In 2020, Japanese novelist Sonoko Machida published a novel titled 52-Hertz Whales, in which the anomalous whale serves as a metaphor for "voiceless" lonely people who find each other by chance.

See also  
 List of unexplained sounds
 List of individual cetaceans

References

Further reading

External links 
 Map of the 52-hertz whale's migration patterns

Individual cetaceans
Pacific Ocean
Sound measurements
Whale sounds